Danehill may refer to:

Danehill (horse)
Danehill, East Sussex

See also  
Dane Hills, Leicester, England